Pulakeshi Nagara, commonly known as Fraser Town, is a suburb of Bangalore Cantonment, in Bangalore North-East, spread over 4 sq. km. It was established in 1906 and is named after Stuart Mitford Fraser (1864–1963), who was the tutor and guardian of Krishna Raja Wadiyar IV, Maharaja of Mysore. Fraser Town was established to de-congest the growing Bangalore Civil and Military Station (otherwise known as the Bangalore Cantonment). The foundation of Fraser Town was laid in August 1910 by Mrs. F J Richards, with a commemorative plaque on the corner of Coles Road and Mosque Road. Fraser Town is a residential and commercial suburb, the prominent roads being Promenade Road, Netaji Road, Madhavraya Mudaliar Road (M M Road), Haines Road, Spencer Road, Wheeler Road, Mosque Road, etc. The suburb is known for its communal harmony with Hindus, Muslims and Christians living side by side in peace.  Before being known as Fraser Town, the suburb was called Mootocherry by the locals. In 1988, the BBMP renamed Fraser Town as Pulakeshinagar, after Pulakeshin II who ruled the Deccan in the 7th century. However, the name has not caught on and continues to be popularly known as Fraser Town.

People and culture
Like in other suburbs of the Bangalore Cantonment, Fraser Town has a large Tamil population. They trace their ancestry to the large number of Tamil soldiers, suppliers and workers who were brought into the Bangalore Civil and Military Station, by the British Army, after the fall of Tippu Sultan. Fraser Town along with other suburbs of the Bangalore Cantonment was directly under the administration of the British Madras Presidency till 1949, when it was handed over to the Mysore State.

Fraser Town is home to a large Christian population, dating back to the days of the British Raj. The Wesleyan Tamil Mission was established in Bangalore by Rev. Elijah Hoole and James Mowatt in April 1821, in the location where the Goodwill's Girls School and the Wesley English Church is presently located, North of Coles Park. Elijah Hoole in his book "Personal Narrative of a Mission to the South of India, from 1820 to 1828" acknowledges the help rendered by the British Resident in Mysore, Arthur Henry Cole, in getting the support of the Maharaja of Mysore. Majority of the Christians were converted from Tamil speaking Hindus in the 19th Century, and have contributed towards building the Bangalore Cantonment. Economically well off Muslims of the Bangalore Cantonment prefer to live in Fraser Town. The suburb serves as an best example for unity in diversity. Hindus and Christians do not play loud music or cause disturbance during the time of breaking the Roza (fast) during the Muslim Holy month of Ramzan. Muslims also reciprocate by co-operating and during the St. Marys's Feast (observed by Christians and Hindus of the Cantonment) and Christmas Celebrations

Colonial Heritage
The streets of Fraser Town, like that of most in the Bangalore Cantonment, are named after European civil servants, military officers and missionaries. Coles Park and Coles Road after Arthur Henry Cole (1780-1844), Resident of Mysore. Haines Road named after Lt. Col. Gregory Haines, Superintendent of the Bangalore Division under Sir Mark Cubbon. Saunders Road named after Charles Burslam Saunders, the Judicial Commissioner at Mysore, who succeeded Sir Mark Cubbon as Commissioner  of Mysore, serving between 1875-1877. Robertson Road, named after Col. Donald Robertson. Wheeler Road, Cleveland Road and surrounding Cleveland Town named after General John Wheeler Cleveland, who along with his wife is buried in the Kalpalli Cemetery. 

Fraser Town was planned after many areas of Bangalore were hit by the plague especially Knoxpet, now called Murphy Town. J. H. Stephens, the Municipal Engineer to the Corporation of Civil and Military Station of Bangalore till 1912, wrote a book called Plague-proof Town Planning, detailing how Fraser Town was designed and built. 

Richard's Park and surrounding Richard's Town after F J Richards, President of the Bangalore Civil and Military Station Municipality between 1908 and 1912, who is credited with starting the Dairy Farm and Veterinary Hospital on Queen's Road, and improving the Ulsoor Lake. Neighbouring Cooke Town is named after G H Cooke, President of the Bangalore Civil and Military Station Municipality between 1928 and 1934, with the Mayo Hall being constructed during his tenure. Further Durbar surgeons Sir. John Colin Campbell has Campbell Road named after him, and Dr. P H Benson has Benson Town named after him.

Inscription

Inscription on the commemorative plaque on the corner of Coles Road and Mosque Road, reads

Landmarks

Coles Park
Coles Park is one of the popular parks in Fraser Town, located West of St. John's Hill, enclosed Promenade Road, Haines Road, Kemp Road, St. John's Church Road and Saunders Road. Coles Park is named after  Arthur Henry Cole (1780-1844), British Resident of Mysore (1809, 1812), who went on to become the Member of Parliament on return to Ireland, representing Enniskillen between 1828-1844. Arthur Henry Cole paid an important role in getting the support of the Maharaja of Mysore for the construction of St. Bartholomew's Church in Mysore. Covering an areas an area of 27,280m2, Coles Park was established in 1914. Coles Park was once in its peak of glory with a bandstand and 3 tennis courts. The Band of the Bangalore Rifle Volunteers, played at the bandstand every first Saturday of the month. YWCA used to run of the tennis courts. The park is fairly maintained, even though there is some encroachments. Coles Park is officially known as the Freedom Fighters Park, however still popularly known by its former name. The Park is open between 5AM to 11PM, but the Nursery is closed except during the Lalbagh Flower Show. The Madras Sappers Regiment has a memorial for fallen Indian soldiers in various conflicts, including the Kargil Conflict.

Albert Bakery

Albert Bakery is a popular Bakery on Mosque Streets, attracting large crowds, famous for its snacks, pastries and non-vegetarian food, and during Ramzan, Albert Bakery is famous for its "bheja" or goat brain puffs. Albert Bakery was founded in 1902, by a Muslim, who felt that giving his bakery an English name would appeal to the cosmopolitan and European clientele in Fraser Town and named it after Prince Albert. Albert Bakery initially operated from a godown and was located in Sangam Lane, off Kamraj Road, and moved to the present Mosque Rd. premises in 1912.

Haji Sir Ismail Sait Mosque

Haji Sir Ismail Sait Mosque  (named after Haji Sir Ismail Sait, a prominent Gujarati speaking Kutchi Memon merchant of Bangalore Cantonment who built the mosque), is located in the posh locality of Fraser Town. It was built at a time when there were only a few Muslims in the suburb.  Haji Sir Ismail Sait arrived in Bangalore in 1870 from Cutch, Gujarat with his parents. After the demise of his father, he started a small business on his own in 1874, and prospered expanding his business around Bangalore and also Madras, trading in goods and Kerosene. At the same time, he was involved in philanthropy and charitable work. Haji Sir Ismail Sait was honoured by the Mysore Government with the title ‘Fakrut-Tujjar', and the British Government knighted him at the Buckingham Palace in recognition of his philanthropy. Haji Sir Ismail Sait also served as a member of the Madras Presidency Legislative Council in 1911. Sir Ismail Sait also founded the Sir Ismail Sait Government Urdu Model Primary Boys and Girls School, an Urdu Primary School on Mosque Road and the Gosha Hospital at Shivajinagar.

Bangalore East Railway Station
Bangalore East Railway Station is an old British Era Railway Station surrounded by Pottery Road, Kumaraswamy Naidu Road, Murgesha Mudaliar Road and Kenchappa Road, is a small quaint station located in Fraser Town. This station is very convenient for residents travelling towards Kolar Gold Fields or returning from Chennai. Express and Mail trains did not stop here till the 1920s. The station is now renovated with a larger platform. Adjacent to Railway Station, there is the Bangalore East Football Grounds, which nowadays is more used for playing Cricket.

Gallery

Notable institutions

 Annaswamy Mudaliar's High School, between Moore Road and Mosque Road
 Clarence High School
 Goodwills Girls School, Promenade Road
 St. Aloysius High School, Assaye Road
 St Anthony's Boys School, St. John's Hill
 St. Francis Xavier Girls High School, St. John's Hill
 St. Germain High School, Fraser Town
 St John's High School 
 St. Joseph's Convent (Rajamma Thambu Chetty School), St. John's Hill
 St Rock`s Girls High School, St. John's Hill
Florence High School, Viviani Road.

References

Cantonments of British India
Bangalore Civil and Military Station
Neighbourhoods in Bangalore